Ficinia spiralis (pīngao, pīkao, or golden sand sedge) is a coastal sedge endemic to New Zealand (including the Chatham Islands). Originally widespread, it has suffered severely from competition with introduced marram grass and animal grazing and now has only a patchy distribution.

Description 

Pīngao is a stout, grass-like plant, 30–90 cm tall, from the sedge family, found on active sand dunes. It is found only in New Zealand and is easily distinguished from other dune species such as spinifex or marram grass. Seen from a distance, pīngao patches have a distinctive orange hue.

Most plants produce long, prostrate, tough rope-like stolons that creep along the sand surface until buried by shifting sand, leaving just the upper portion of leaves exposed. Some southern South Island populations produce dense tussock-like plants without extensive stolons.

Numerous tough, roughly textured leaves are borne in dense tufts on well-spaced, short, upright stems (tillers), along the length of stolons. The narrow leaves are 2–5 mm wide, with colour ranging from bright green when young through golden yellow to a deep orange on mature plants.

Small, dark brown flowers appear in spring and are arranged spirally in tight clusters around the upper 10–30 cm of the upright stem (culm), interspersed with leaf-like bracts. The seeds are shiny, dark brown, egg-shaped, 3–5 mm long, and ripen and fall in early summer. Pīngao can also reproduce vegetatively with its stolons.

Taxonomy 
Pīngao was first scientifically described by Achille Richard in 1832, and was given the name Isolepis spiralis. In 1853 Joseph Dalton Hooker placed Pīngao in the genus Desmoschoenus. In 2010 A. M. Muasyaa and P. J. de Lange merged the genus Desmoschoenus into Ficinia after their research showed that the two were indistinguishable.

In culture 
One Māori name for pīngao (or pikao, in Ngai Tahu dialect) is ngā tukemata o Tāne, or "Tāne's eyebrows". 

Leaves from pīngao, which turn bright yellow as they dry, are used by Māori in traditional weaving, especially the construction of hats (pōtae), bags (kete), and mats (whāriki). It is also used to create decorative tukutuku panels in a wharenui. The length, width, and strength of the leaves for weaving vary among pīngao populations growing in different areas. Leaves were also used by Māori for thatching.

Conservation 

Pīngao is an important sand-binding plant, but is out-competed by introduced sand binding species such as marram and Pinus radiata, and introduced weeds such as yellow tree lupins. Marram and pines create more stable dunes, so during colonisation large areas of pīngao were burnt. It is now restricted to scattered patches around coastal New Zealand, and is actively planted by community groups and the Department of Conservation when restoring native ecosystems.

References

External links

 Pīngao discussed on RNZ Critter of the Week, 3 June 2016
 Objects made from pingao in the collection of the Museum of New Zealand Te Papa Tongarewa

Cyperaceae
Endemic flora of New Zealand
Stoloniferous plants
Taxa named by Achille Richard